Moussa N'Diaye may refer to:
 Moussa N'Diaye (footballer, born 1979), Senegalese footballer
 Moussa Ndiaye (footballer, born 1999), Senegalese footballer
 Moussa N'Diaye (footballer, born 2002), Senegalese footballer
 Moussa Narou N'Diaye, Senegalese basketball player